The following is a list of the television networks and announcers who have broadcast college football's Cheez-It Bowl throughout the years.

The bowl was known by various prior names; Blockbuster Bowl (1990–1993), Carquest Bowl (1994–1997), MicronPC Bowl (1998), MicronPC.com Bowl (1999–2000), Visit Florida Tangerine Bowl (2001), Mazda Tangerine Bowl (2002–2003), Champs Sports Bowl (2004–2011), Russell Athletic Bowl (2012–2016), and Camping World Bowl (2017–2019).

Television

Radio

References

Cheez-It
Broadcasters
Cheez-It
Cheez-It
Cheez-It
Cheez-It